Geoy Tepe is an archaeological site in northwestern Iran, about 7 kilometers south of Urmia (Reżāʾīya). It was found by an aerial survey of ancient sites in Persia done by Erich Schmidt in the 1930s.

The site's mound is 80 feet tall and is situated by a natural spring. T. Burton Brown of Great Britain excavated the site in August 1948. It was found to have been continuously occupied from the 4th millennium BCE until 1200 BCE.

Remains of the earliest stage of the Kura-Araxes culture have been found here.

References

Tells (archaeology)
Archaeological sites in Iran
Former populated places in Iran
Buildings and structures in West Azerbaijan Province
Kura-Araxes culture
National works of Iran